Chris Malinchak is an American electronic musician, DJ and record producer best known for his 2013 debut single "So Good to Me", a hit in the United Kingdom.

Music career
Malinchak has produced several songs since 2012, all of which are available on YouTube. His track "So Good to Me" was released as his debut single on May 12, 2013 with an accompanying music video. This song entered the UK Singles Chart at number 2, only beaten by Daft Punk's "Get Lucky". The track sold about 73,000 copies in its debut week and on July 22, 2013 acclaimed silver certification, selling over 200,000 copies in the UK. On August 22, 2013, Malinchak released "So into You", a remix of "Don't Disturb this Groove", a 1987 hit by the System. Malinchak's second single, "If U Got It" was released January 24, 2014 and peaked at number 23 in the UK. His third single titled "Stranger" was released in February 2014.

Discography

Albums
 Night Work (2021)

EP
 Weird Kid EP (2018) (Chris Malinchak & Kiesza)
 Wash My Soul EP (2019)
 Photograph EP (2019)

Singles

References

DJs from New York City
American house musicians
Living people
Electronic dance music DJs
1989 births